Christophe Ville (born 15 June 1963) is a French former professional ice hockey centre. He competed in the men's tournaments at the 1988 Winter Olympics, the 1992 Winter Olympics and the 1994 Winter Olympics.

References

External links
 

1963 births
Living people
Brûleurs de Loups players
Chamonix HC players
Courmaosta HC players
French ice hockey centres
Ice hockey players at the 1988 Winter Olympics
Ice hockey players at the 1992 Winter Olympics
Ice hockey players at the 1994 Winter Olympics
Olympic ice hockey players of France
Sportspeople from Dijon